Leucoctenorrhoe is a monotypic moth genus in the family Geometridae. Its only species, Leucoctenorrhoe quadrilinea, is found in Peru. Both the genus and species were described by Warren in 1904.

References

External links

Asthenini